Jansson is a Swedish patronymic surname, meaning "son of Jan", derived from Johannes, a cognate of John.  There are alternate Belgian, German, Dutch, Danish, Latvian and Norwegian spellings. Jansson is rare as a given name.

Geographical distribution
As of 2014, 86.2% of all known bearers of the surname Jansson were residents of Sweden, 5.1% of Finland, 2.9% of the United States and 1.7% of Norway.

In Sweden, the frequency of the surname was higher than national average (1:199) in the following counties:
 1. Uppsala (1:75)
 2. Värmland (1:77)
 3. Örebro (1:99)
 4. Dalarna (1:101)
 5. Västmanland (1:109)
 6. Gävleborg (1:125)
 7. Södermanland (1:141)

In Finland, the frequency of the surname was higher than national average (1:1,893) in the following regions:
 1. Åland (1:40)
 2. Ostrobothnia (1:545)
 3. Central Ostrobothnia (1:1,096)
 4. Southwest Finland (1:1,209)
 5. Uusimaa (1,782)

Surname

 AnnMari Jansson (1934–2007), Swedish systems ecologist
 Augusta Jansson (1859 – 1932), Swedish entrepreneur
Bengt Jansson (born 1943), former Swedish international speedway rider
Börje Jansson (born 1942), Swedish chess player
Camilla Sköld Jansson (born 1957), Swedish politician
Erik Jansson (1808–1850), leader of a Swedish pietist sect that emigrated to the United States in 1846
Erik Jansson (cyclist) (1907–1993), Swedish, Olympic road racing cyclist
Folke Jansson (1897–1965), Swedish, Olympics triple jump
Gustaf Jansson (1922–2012), Swedish, Olympic marathoner
Helena Jansson (born 1985), Swedish orienteer
Herold Jansson (1899–1965), Danish, Olympic gymnast and diver
Jan-Magnus Jansson (1922–2003), Finnish politician
Jan Janssonius (1588–1664), also known as Jan Jansson, Dutch cartographer
Jan Jansson (footballer) (born 1968), Swedish
Jesper Jansson (born 1971), Swedish football player
Jimmy Jansson (born 1985), Swedish singer and songwriter
John Jansson (1892–1943), Swedish, Olympic diver
Karl Emanuel Jansson (1846–1874), Finnish artist
Lars Jansson (composer), (born 1951), Swedish composer
Marlena Jansson (born 1970), Swedish orienteering competitor
Mats Jansson (born 1951), Swedish, Chief Executive Officer of SAS Group
Mikael Jansson (politician) (born 1965), Swedish politician
Nanna Jansson (born 1983), Swedish, Olympic ice hockey medalist
Pontus Jansson (born 1991), Swedish footballer
Roger Jansson (born 1943), Finnish politician
Sven B. F. Jansson (1906–1987), Swedish linguist
Sven-Åke Jansson (1937–2014), Swedish Army lieutenant general
Tommy Jansson (1952–1976), Swedish motorcycle speedway rider
Tove Jansson (1914–2001), Finnish novelist, painter, illustrator and comic strip author
Ulrik Jansson (born 1968), former Swedish footballer
Viktor Jansson (1886–1958), Finnish sculptor

Given name

Jansson Stegner (born 1972), American artist

Software
Jansson, a C language cross platform (including Unix, and Windows) package capable of encoding, decoding and manipulating JSON data

See also
Janson
Jenson

References

Swedish-language surnames
Patronymic surnames